Senseless is a 2008 film based on Stona Fitch's 2001 novel of the same name, starring Jason Behr and Emma Catherwood, and directed by Symon Hynd.

External links
 IMDB
 
 Stona Fitch Homepage
 Eye For Film Review
 Fantasy Film Archiv Review
 Movie 2 Movie Review

2008 films
British horror drama films
2000s British films